St. John's Episcopal Church is located in Ellicott City in Howard County, Maryland, United States.

The church stands on a land grant originally patented as "Three Brothers". A section of the land owned by Caleb Dorsey was donated for the church. The building was erected out of local granite in 1823. The church was designed by architect Norris G. Starkweather, who also designed White Hall, Temora, and First Presbyterian Church and Manse. Dr. Charles Worthington Dorsey and George Howard oversaw the construction. The rectory was built in 1940.

See also
List of Howard County properties in the Maryland Historical Trust

External links 
Official website

References

Churches in Howard County, Maryland
Churches in Ellicott City, Maryland
History of Maryland